= Essex Probate and Family Court =

Court in Salem, Massachusetts

Coordinates: 42.518°N 70.888°W

Essex Probate and Family Court is a court located on 36 Federal Street in Salem, Massachusetts in the County of Essex. The court deals in Probate and Family Law matters.

== Justices ==
The following justices operate out of the Essex Probate & Family Court:

- Honorable Jennifer Rivera-Ulwick, First Justice
- Honorable Mary Anne Sahagian
- Honorable Joan Armstrong
- Honorable Randy Kaplan

== Sources & Links ==
- Essex Probate & Family Court Official Website
- List of Probate Courts in Massachusetts
